The 2nd World Mahjong Championship 2010 was held at the Nationaal Denksport Centrum 'Den Hommel' in Utrecht, Netherlands from August 27 to 29, in 2010.

Championship
In this competition, there was a national team system which awards top 3 players in each country instead of the team system.

Results
The names are ordered as Given name and Surname.

National top players

Participating countries
208 competitors from 13 countries participated. 8 Chinese competitors did not show up in the competition at the first day.















References

External links
WMC 2010

Mahjong world championships